The Karelo-Finnish Soviet Socialist Republic (Karelo-Finnish SSR;), also called Soviet Karelia or simply known as Karelia, was a republic of the Soviet Union. It existed from 1940 until it was made part of the Russian SFSR in 1956 as the Karelian Autonomous Soviet Socialist Republic.  The latter became the Republic of Karelia, a federal subject of Russia, on 13 November 1991.

History
The Karelo-Finnish Soviet Socialist Republic was established by the Soviet government on 31 March 1940 by merging the KASSR with the Finnish Democratic Republic.  The latter was created in territory ceded by Finland in the Winter War by the Moscow Peace Treaty, namely the Karelian Isthmus and Ladoga Karelia, including the cities of Viipuri and Sortavala.

Virtually the entire Karelian population of the ceded areas, about 422,000 people, was evacuated to Finland, and the territories were settled by peoples from other parts of the Soviet Union.

Creating a new Republic of the Union for an ethnic group that was not large in absolute terms, nor constituted anything close to a majority in its territory, nor had been a separate independent nation before its incorporation into the USSR, was unprecedented in the history of the USSR. Some later historians believe that the elevation of Soviet Karelia from an Autonomous Soviet Socialist Republic (within the RSFSR) to an SSR was a political move as a "convenient means for facilitating the possible incorporation of additional Finnish territory" (or, possibly, the whole of Finland) into the USSR.

In 1941, Finland retook the territory that it had lost in 1940 and occupied most of the Karelian lands that had been within the USSR before 1940, including the capital Petrozavodsk (Petroskoi). In 1944, the Soviet Union recaptured the area. Soviet sovereignty was recognized by Finland in the Moscow Armistice and Paris Peace Treaty. The Finnish Karelians were evacuated to Finland again.

In September 1944, the Karelian Isthmus with Vyborg (Viipuri) was transferred from the Karelo-Finnish SSR to the Leningrad Oblast of the RSFSR, but Ladoga Karelia remained a part of the republic.

On 16 July 1956, the republic was incorporated into the Russian SFSR as the Karelian Autonomous Soviet Socialist Republic. This move can perhaps be explained in the context of the general post-war improvement of Finno-Soviet relations, which also included such steps as the Soviets' return of the Porkkala Naval Base leased territory to full Finnish sovereignty (January 1956), and leasing Maly Vysotsky Island and the Soviet section of the Saimaa Canal (conquered by the USSR in 1940 and 1944) back to Finland (1963).

The abolition of the Karelian SSR in 1956 was the only case in the history of the USSR (1922–1991) of merging a member republic of the USSR into another republic.  The state emblem of the Soviet Union had to be changed to reflect this, with one of the 16 ribbons symbolizing constituent republics removed. Soviet banknotes bearing the emblem were also changed accordingly.

In the last days of the USSR, the Karelian ASSR became the Republic of Karelia, a subdivision of the Russian Federation, on 13 November 1991.

Politics
The chairman of the Karelo-Finnish Supreme Soviet (1940–1956) was a Finnish communist Otto Wille Kuusinen. In the republic, there was also a separate Karelo-Finnish Communist Party led in the 1940s by G.N. Kupriyanov.

Yuri Andropov served for some years as the first secretary of the republic's Komsomol branch, the Leninist Communist Youth League of the Karelo-Finnish Soviet Socialist Republic.

Chairmen of the Supreme Soviet

Chairmen of the Presidium of the Supreme Soviet

Chairmen of the Council of People's Commissars

The Council of People's Commissars was renamed the Council of Ministers in 1946.

See also
Winter War
Karelia
Karelia (historical province of Finland)
Karelian question in Finnish politics
Republics of the Soviet Union
First Secretary of the Karelian Communist Party

References

 
Former socialist republics
Republics of the Soviet Union
History of the Republic of Karelia
Eastern Bloc
History of Karelia
1940s in Finland
Winter War
States and territories established in 1940
States and territories disestablished in 1956
1940 establishments in the Soviet Union
1956 disestablishments in the Soviet Union